The polonaise is a dance of Polish origin, one of the five Polish national dances in  time. Its name is French for "Polish" adjective feminine/"Polish woman"/"girl". The original Polish name of the dance is Chodzony, meaning "the walking dance". It is one of the most ancient Polish dances representing Polish cultural dance tradition. Polonaise dance influenced European ballrooms, folk music and European classical music.   

The polonaise has a rhythm quite close to that of the Swedish semiquaver or sixteenth-note polska, and the two dances share a common origin. Polska dance was introduced to Sweden during the period of the Vasa dynasty.

The polonaise is a very popular dance uninterruptedly danced in Poland till today. It is the dance danced as an opening dance in all major official balls, events, at the final year of the high school ball called "studniówka", at New Year's balls, national days as well as various less official parties. The polonaise is always the first dance at a studniówka ("student ball"), the Polish equivalent of the senior prom that occurs approximately 100 days before exams, hence its name "studniówka" or literally in Polish "the ball of the hundred days".

Influence of Polonaise in music

The notation alla polacca ( means "polonaise") on a musical score indicates that the piece should be played with the rhythm and character of a polonaise. For example, the third movement of Beethoven's Triple Concerto op. 56, marked "Rondo alla polacca," and the finale of Chopin's Variations on "Là ci darem la mano" both feature this notation. In his book Classic Music: Expression, Form, and Style, Leonard G. Ratner cites the fourth movement from Beethoven's Serenade in D major, Op. 8, marked "Allegretto alla Polacca," as a representative example of the polonaise dance topic (Ratner 1980, pp. 12–13).

Frédéric Chopin's polonaises are generally the best known of all polonaises in classical music.  Other composers who wrote polonaises or pieces in polonaise rhythm include Johann Sebastian Bach, Georg Philipp Telemann, Wolfgang Amadeus Mozart, Ludwig van Beethoven, Karol Kurpiński, Józef Elsner, Maria Agata Szymanowska, Henryk Wieniawski, Franz Schubert, Carl Maria von Weber, Robert Schumann, Franz Liszt, Johann Kaspar Mertz, Moritz Moszkowski, Modest Mussorgsky, Nicolai Rimsky-Korsakov, Pyotr Ilyich Tchaikovsky and Alexander Scriabin.

Another more recent prolific polonaise composer was the American Edward Alexander MacDowell.

John Philip Sousa wrote the Presidential Polonaise, intended to keep visitors moving briskly through the White House receiving line. Sousa wrote it in 1886 after a suggestion from President Chester A. Arthur. 

Tchaikovsky's opera Eugene Onegin, an adaption of Alexander Pushkin's novel in poetry verse, includes a famous polonaise.

National dance
The polonaise is a Polish dance and is one of the five historic national dances of Poland. The others are the Mazur (Mazurka), Kujawiak, Krakowiak and Oberek. Polonaise originated as a peasant dance known under various names – chodzony ("pacer"), chmielowy ("hops"), pieszy ("walker") or wielki ("great"), recorded as early as the 15th century. In later centuries, it gained popularity among the urban population and the nobles.<ref>Roderyk Lange. Tradycyjny taniec ludowy w Polsce i jego przeobrażenia w czasie i przestrzeni. PUNO. 1978. p. 40.</ref> By the late 16th century, the folk versions of polonaise (accompanied by singing) were commonly danced by the lower Polish nobility, but the dance was not known under its current name until the 17th century. With time, it also became a favorite dance of the Polish aristocratic class and acquired an instrumental form.

Outside Poland
Polonaise in French Courts

The polonaise or polonez, was first introduced in the 17th century in French courts, although the form originated in Poland and was very popular throughout Europe. This dance in 3/4 metre was designed to entertain the French royal court. The term polonaise was used over the term polonez at the start of the 18th century.

Princess Anna Maria of Saxony 

Princess Anna Maria of Saxony collected sheet music for polonaises throughout her life time, collecting over 350. Her collection was focused on the finest examples of instrumentation.

Maluku

The polones (from either the Dutch polonez, or possibly the Portuguese polonesa'') is a common feature of wedding receptions in Maluku. A loosely-defined group dance, it typically resembles a country dance or cèilidh, or in some cases a line dance.

Gallery

See also
Waltz
Mazurka
Varsovienne
Kujawiak
Krakowiak
Redowa

References

External links 
 Polonaise ‒ The Royal Dance Every Polish Teenager Has to Master

Polish styles of music
Polish dances
Dance forms in classical music
Triple time dances